John Baker Hollister (November 7, 1890 – January 4, 1979) was a three-term U.S. Representative from Ohio from 1931 to 1937.

Biography 
Born in Cincinnati, Hollister attended the local schools and St. Paul's School in Concord, New Hampshire. He graduated from Yale University in 1911, and next studied at the University of Munich, Germany for a year. He graduated from Harvard Law School in 1915. Hollister was admitted to the bar the same year and began his practice in Cincinnati, Ohio.

World War I 
On August 15, 1917, he was appointed a first lieutenant in the United States Army and served in France during World War I as captain of Battery B, Forty-sixth Artillery Corps, later being in command of the Third Battalion of his regiment. Following the Armistice, he was on detached service with the American Relief Administration under Herbert Hoover in 1919.

Career
After his discharge, Hollister resumed his law practice in Cincinnati. He served as director of various financial and manufacturing corporations, and was a member of the Cincinnati Board of Education from 1921 to 1929.

Congress 
Hollister was elected as a Republican to the Seventy-second Congress in a special election held on November 3, 1931, to fill the vacancy created by the death of Nicholas Longworth. He was reelected to the two succeeding Congresses and served from November 3, 1931, to January 3, 1937. He was defeated for reelection in 1936 and resumed the practice of law.

Later career 
Hollister served as a delegate to the Republican National Conventions in 1940, 1944, 1948, and 1952. He headed the United Nations Relief Rehabilitation Association's mission to the Netherlands, 1945, and served as executive director of the Hoover Commission from October 1953 to July 1955. He was director of the International Cooperation Administration from June 15, 1955, until his resignation on September 13, 1957.

Death
He returned to Cincinnati, where he died on January 4, 1979, at the age of 88. His remains were cremated and the ashes interred in Spring Grove Cemetery.

Sources

1890 births
1979 deaths
Yale University alumni
Harvard Law School alumni
American Presbyterians
Politicians from Cincinnati
Ohio lawyers
Politicians from Concord, New Hampshire
Burials at Spring Grove Cemetery
United States Army officers
United States Army personnel of World War I
Ludwig Maximilian University of Munich alumni
20th-century American politicians
20th-century American lawyers
Republican Party members of the United States House of Representatives from Ohio